Kayla Renae McBride (born June 25, 1992) is an American professional basketball player for the Minnesota Lynx of the Women's National Basketball Association (WNBA) and Fenerbahçe of the Turkish Super League (KBSL). She was drafted third overall by the San Antonio Stars in the 2014 WNBA draft. McBride played shooting guard for Notre Dame, where she led the Fighting Irish to four consecutive Final Fours and three NCAA championship appearances.

Early life
McBride is the daughter of LaMont and LuAnn McBride. McBride has one younger brother Aaron and two younger sisters Karlee and Jayden. Her sister Karlee played basketball for Indiana University.

High school career
McBride attended Villa Maria Academy in Erie, Pennsylvania. McBride was a three-year starter and four-year letterwinner at Villa Maria under head coach Scott Dibble, helping Victors to combined record of 106–15 (.876) with two Pennsylvania Class AA state titles (2009, 2010) and a state runner-up finish (2007) in her prep career. In her freshman year in 2006–07, served as top reserve ("sixth man") on Class AA state runner-up squad that went 27–5; she averaged 6.7 ppg., 4.3 rpg., 1.6 spg. and 1.3 apg. with a .740 free throw percentage that season and earned Swin Cash award as Western Pennsylvania's Freshman of the Year in 2007. As a sophomore in 2007–08, sparked top-ranked team in Pennsylvania to 24–5 record while averaging 13.0 ppg., 6.8 rpg., 4.5 apg., 3.1 spg. and shooting .730 from foul line. During her junior year in 2008–09, helped VMA to 27–3 record and state title, while team rose as high as 15th in ESPN Hoopgurlz East Region rankings during season ... posted team highs of 17.3 ppg., 7.8 rpg. and 4.6 apg., along with 3.1 spg. and .820 free throw percentage. As a senior in 2009–10, led Villa Maria to a 28–2 record and its second consecutive state championship ... averaged 20.5 ppg., 11.8 rpg. and 5.6 spg., including 29 points and 11 rebounds in Class AA state final against York Catholic. She was named the District 10 Player of the Year and Pennsylvania Class AA Player of the Year in 2009 and 2010. McBride was the Pennsylvania Gatorade Player of the Year in 2010. McBride owns school records (boys or girls) in career points (1,727), rebounds (931), assists (474), steals (420) and blocked shots (191).

College career

Freshman season (2010–2011)
McBride went to the University of Notre Dame to play basketball. As a freshman, she had to sit out half of the season because of academic issues. She watched from the sidelines as her team lost to Texas A&M in the 2011 NCAA Championship. That season she appeared in 19 games, starting in 4. McBride averaged 8.7 points, 3.3 rebounds, and shot .557 from the field, the third highest on her team. They ended the season with a 31–8 record.

Sophomore season (2011–2012)
Her sophomore season she appeared in all 39 games, and started in 36 of those 39 games. In her sophomore year she ranked fourth on the team with a .496 field goal percentage, fourth on the team in scoring, averaging 11.6 points per game, and won the Big East regular-season free throw percentage crown, with a free throw percentage of .919. The Fighting Irish again appeared in the championship, and again, they lost, but this time to Baylor. During that game McBride scored 11 points.

Junior season (2012–2013)
Again, she played all 37 games, and started in 36 games. McBride averaged 15.9 points, 4.6 rebounds, and 2.4 assists per game. She led the league in free throw percentage, and almost tied ninth in the country but was two made foul shots shy of the minimum to qualify for the national ranking. Her field goal percentage was .453 that season, her lowest yet. Notre Dame went to the Final Four for the third time in a row, but they lost to UConn.

Senior season (2013–2014)
McBride started in all 38 games. She averaged career highs of 17.6 points, 5.3 rebounds, and 3.8 assists per game. The Fighting Irish went undefeated, until during the championship game against Connecticut, who was also undefeated because both teams were in a different conference (with Notre Dame in the ACC conference), it was the first time the two teams had met that season. It was McBride's last chance to win a college championship. But Notre Dame lost in the second half, with the final score being 79–58. McBride contributed 21 points and 5 rebounds to her last game as a collegiate athlete.

Notre  Dame statistics
Source

WNBA

San Antonio Stars (2014-2017)
In the 2014 WNBA Draft, McBride was drafted third overall by the San Antonio Stars. She started all 34 games for the Stars in her rookie season, leading the Stars in scoring, averaging 13.0 ppg, which also ranked third among rookies in the WNBA. She was one of three unanimous selections to the WNBA All-Rookie Team and finished third in Rookie of the Year voting. McBride scored in double-figures in 21 games, including two 30-point performances, while recording the most points by a Stars rookie (442) since the team relocated to San Antonio. She set career highs in assists (6) and steals (5), while scoring 15 points at Tulsa (7/17). The Stars achieved a playoff berth and finished third place in the Western Conference but were eliminated by the Minnesota Lynx in a 2-game sweep during the first round. McBride led the Stars in scoring during the postseason (22.5 ppg), while scoring a team-high 20 points in Game 1 of the Western Conference Semifinals and 25 points in Game 2.

In her second season, McBride was voted into the 2015 WNBA All-Star Game, and finished the season, averaging 13.8 ppg, but the Stars didn't make the playoffs this time.

In the 2016 season, McBride would continue to improve, but suffered a right foot injury on July 2 against the Minnesota Lynx. She was ruled out for the remainder of the season and finished with a career-high of 17.1 ppg.

In the 2017 season, McBride would return healthy and play 30 games with 29 starts, averaging 15.4 ppg. On August 1, 2017, McBride scored a career-high 31 points in a 93–81 win over the New York Liberty. The Stars finished with a league worst 8–26 record.

Las Vegas Aces (2018-2020)
In 2018, the Stars relocated to Las Vegas, Nevada and were renamed the Las Vegas Aces. In March 2018, McBride re-signed with the Aces to a multi-year deal in free agency. In 2018, McBride have the best season of her career thus far. On June 28, 2018, McBride scored a new career-high of 38 points in a 97–91 loss to Dallas Wings. McBride would be an all-star for the second time in her career as she was voted into the 2018 WNBA All-Star Game. By the end of the season, McBride averaged a new career-high in scoring, this performance along with rookie sensation A'ja Wilson would almost lead the Aces back in the playoffs but they fell short finishing 9th place in the league with a 14–20 record.

In 2019, the Aces had a much improved season and finished with a 21–13 record as the number 4 seed, receiving a bye to the second round under the league's new playoff format, bringing the franchise back to the playoffs for the first time since 2014. McBride was voted into the 2019 WNBA All-Star Game, making it her fourth all-star appearance. In the second round elimination game, the Aces would defeat the Chicago Sky 93-92 off a game winning half-court shot by teammate Dearica Hamby. However, in the semi-finals, the Aces would lose to the Washington Mystics in four games.

In 2020, the season was delayed and shortened to 22 games in a bubble due to the COVID-19 pandemic. McBride played and started in all 22 games, the Aces finished 18–4 with the number 1 seed, receiving a double bye to the semi-finals. In the semi-finals, the Aces would advance to the Finals after defeating the Connecticut Sun in a hard-fought five-game series but would end up getting swept by the Seattle Storm.

Minnesota Lynx (2021-Present)
In 2021, McBride became an unrestricted free agent and signed with the Minnesota Lynx.

Overseas
In the 2014–15 off-season, McBride played in Hungary for Uniqa Sopron. In the 2015–16 off-season, McBride played in Russia for Nadezhda Orenburg. As of November 2016, it was confirmed that McBride is playing in Turkey for Yakın Doğu Üniversitesi for the 2016–17 off-season. In 2017, McBride resigned with Yakın Doğu Üniversitesi for the 2017–18 off-season. In 2018, she signed with UMMC Ekaterinburg of the Russian League for the 2018-19 off-season. McBride signed with Fenerbahçe for the 2020–21 season. At the end of the season, she extended her contract with Fenerbahçe for two more years. In 2020-21, Fenerbahçe won the bronze medal by ending in third place in EuroLeague Women by beating Sopron Basket 64-58 in the third-place playoff with a double-double from Kayla McBride but Sopron Basket reversed the outcome in 2021-22 so that Fenerbahçe ended the season as silver medalists after Sopron Basket defeated Fenerbahçe 60-55 in the final.

WNBA career statistics

Regular season

|-
| align="left" | 2014
| align="left" | San Antonio
| 34 || 34 || 26.0 || .406 || .396 || .846 || 2.3 || 1.7 || 0.9 || 0.1 || 1.2 || 13.0
|-
| align="left" | 2015
| align="left" | San Antonio
| 27 || 25 || 28.0 || .382 || .373 || .879 || 3.1 || 1.6 || 1.0 || 0.1 || 1.6 || 13.8
|-
| align="left" | 2016
| align="left" | San Antonio
| 17 || 17 || 30.8 || .367 || .305 || .853 || 4.0 || 1.9 || 1.0 || 0.1 || 2.0 || 17.1
|-
| align="left" | 2017
| align="left" | San Antonio
| 30 || 29 || 33.2 || .381 || .310 || .925 || 4.1 || 2.6 || 1.1 || 0.2 || 1.9 || 15.4
|-
| align="left" | 2018
| align="left" | Las Vegas
| 31 || 31 || 32.3 || .449 || .393 || .917 || 3.9 || 3.5 || 1.0 || 0.1 || 2.0 || 18.2
|-
| align="left" | 2019
| align="left" | Las Vegas
| 34 || 34 || 29.1 || .425 || .428 || .906 || 4.2 || 2.6 || 1.2 || 0.1 || 1.7 || 13.3
|-
| align="left" | 2020
| align="left" | Las Vegas
| 22 || 22 || 26.6 || .425 || .342 || .897 || 2.3 || 2.4 || 1.2 || 0.1 || 1.4 || 12.5
|-
| align="left" | 2021
| align="left" | Minnesota
| 32 || 32 || 31.6 || .433 || .379 || .910 || 3.6 || 2.3 || 0.8 || 0.2 || 1.1 || 13.7
|-
| align="left" | 2022
| align="left" | Minnesota
| 31 || 31 || 29.8 || .405 || .356 || .909 || 2.8 || 2.1 || 1.0 || 0.1 || 1.5 || 13.3
|-
| align="left" | Career
| align="left" | 9 years, 2 teams
| 258 || 255 || 29.7 || .409 || .368 || .898 || 3.4 || 2.3 || 1.1 || 0.1 || 1.6 || 14.4

Postseason

|-
| align="left" | 2014
| align="left" | San Antonio
| 2 || 2 || 30.2 || .593 || .600 || 1.000 || 2.5 || 0.5 || 1.0 || 0.0 || 3.5 || 22.5
|-
| align="left" | 2019
| align="left" | Las Vegas
| 5 || 5 || 32.6 || .447 || .429 || .950 || 3.2 || 3.0 || 0.4 || 0.0 || 2.2 || 14.0  
|-
| align="left" | 2020
| align="left" | Las Vegas
| 8 || 8 || 30.9 || .400 || .345 || 1.000 || 3.4 || 2.9 || 0.5 || 0.1 || 1.4 || 9.5  
|-
| align="left" | 2021
| align="left" | Minnesota
| 1 || 1 || 34.0 || .538 || .571 || .500 || 7.0 || 2.0 || 0.0 || 0.0 || 6.0 || 19.0 
|-
| align="left" | Career
| align="left" |4 years, 2 teams
| 16 || 16 || 31.6 || .459 || .433 || .949 || 3.4 || 2.6 || 0.5 || 0.1 || 2.2 || 13.1

EuroLeague

USA Basketball
McBride was named to the USA Basketball U18 team. The USA team was one of eight teams from North, South and Central America, along with the Caribbean, invited to participate in the 2010 FIBA Americas U18 Championship For Women, held at the U.S. Olympic Training Center, in Colorado Springs, Colorado. The top finishing team qualify for the 2011 FIBA U19 Women's World Championship. The team was coached by Jennifer Rizzotti. The team won all five games, earning the gold medal for the event, and a place in the 2011 U19 World Championship for women. McBride averaged 8.2 points per games, reaching double-digits in three of the contests. She was third leading on the team with eight steals.

References

External links

WNBA Rookie Profile
USA Basketball profile

1992 births
Living people
All-American college women's basketball players
American expatriate basketball people in Hungary
American expatriate basketball people in Russia
American expatriate basketball people in Turkey
American women's basketball players
Basketball players from Pennsylvania
Fenerbahçe women's basketball players
Las Vegas Aces players
McDonald's High School All-Americans
Minnesota Lynx players
Notre Dame Fighting Irish women's basketball players
Parade High School All-Americans (girls' basketball)
San Antonio Stars draft picks
San Antonio Stars players
Shooting guards
Sportspeople from Erie, Pennsylvania
Women's National Basketball Association All-Stars